Melanthiini is a tribe of geometer moths under subfamily Larentiinae. The tribe was described by Philogène Auguste Joseph Duponchel in 1845.

Recognized genera
 Anticollix Prout, 1938
 Bundelia Viidalepp, 1988
 Coenocalpe Hübner, 1825
 Collix Guenée in Boisduval & Guenée, 1857
 Echthrocollix Inoue, 1953
 Herbulotia Inoue, 1953
 Horisme Hübner, [1825]
 Kauria Viidalepp, 1988
 Melanthia Duponchel, 1829
 Pseudocollix Warren, 1895
 Zola Warren, 1894

References
 
 "Tribus Melanthiini". BioLib.cz.

External links
 

 
Larentiinae